TT races may refer to:

Isle of Man TT - motorcycle road races held annually in the Isle of Man
Welsh TT races - historic motorcycle road races originally held annually on Pendine Sands, Wales, UK circa 1920
Welsh TT races - historic motorcycle road races originally held annually at Mynydd Epynt, Wales, UK circa 1950

See also:
Dutch TT - a traditional name applied to the annual Grand Prix motorcycle races held at the Assen Circuit in The Netherlands
TT Circuit Assen